Ken Pawsey (born 13 December 1940) is an Australian ice hockey player. He competed in the men's tournament at the 1960 Winter Olympics.

References

1940 births
Living people
Australian ice hockey players
Olympic ice hockey players of Australia
Ice hockey players at the 1960 Winter Olympics
Sportspeople from Melbourne